Azizlu (also Romanized as ‘Azīzlū) is a village in Ojarud-e Gharbi Rural District, in the Central District of Germi County, Ardabil Province, Iran. At the 2006 census, its population was 9, in 4 families.

References 

Towns and villages in Germi County